James Logue may refer to:

 James Washington Logue (1863–1925), U.S. Representative from Pennsylvania
 James Logue (ice hockey) (born 1939), American ice hockey goaltender
 James Logue (hurler) (born 1989), Irish hurler